Color Visión is a television network based in the Dominican Republic. It is one of the largest television channels in that country. Color Visión is channel 9 in the Dominican Republic's television dial.

History
Color Visión began regularly scheduled programming on November 30, 1969, in the city of Santiago de los Caballeros. The first transmissions were from the Matum hotel, in Santiago.,

In 1970, Color Visión moved its daily transmissions to Santo Domingo. There, Color Visión used the famous Hotel Jaragua's areas as television sets. One of the first show hosts was Manolo Quiroz.

Later on, Dominican businessman Poppy Bermudez put a large amount of money into helping Color Visión open its own studio.

The 1970s were times of growth for the company, as many locally produced programs were shown, and people such as Jack Veneno found work at the station, and a niche among Dominican television viewers.

During the 1980s, Color Visión contracted such stars as Freddy Beras-Goico (cousin of Charytín Goico) and Miledys Cabral.

For the next twenty years, the channel continued growing nationally. Color Visión became the first Dominican channel to have live internet telecasts, and, in 2003, it began to be shown in the United States, through the DirecTV system, being called Television Dominicana.

Color Visión offers variety and news shows, as well as telenovelas, among other types of programming.

Programs 

Monday And Friday

Hoy Mismo (2000–present)
El Despertador (2014–present)
Hablando De Salud (20??-20??)
ENTRANDO POR LA COCINA (2007–2012)
El Show Del Mediodia (1977–Present)
Mundo Vision (1969–2014)
Noticias SIN (2014–present)
Con Los Famosos (1998–Present)
Noti Espetaculos (2005–2011)
ACERCATE A LOS ASTROS (2005–2012)
La Super Revista (1990–2014)
Piedra, Papel & Tijera (2001–2011)
Happy Team (2009-2014)
Con Freddy Y Punto (2003–2010)
Perdone La Hora (2000–2012)
Te Estan Facturando (1993–20??)
Sigue la noche       (2011–present)
Saturdays

LA POLICIA T.V (2004–Present)
Sentido Comun (19??-Present)
Sabado Chiquito (1989–2011)
Sabado De Corporan (1988–2012)
La Vida Misma (2000–Present)
Nuria (1987–Present)
De La Semana (2004–Present)
Encuentro (2008–Present)
Gerardo De Fiesta (2009–Present)

Sundays

El Mundo De La Fauna
Entrevista Mundo Vision (19??-20??)
Punto De Vista
Lideres (2003–Present)
Aeromundo (1967–Present)
9 X 9 Roberto (1999–2010)
Formula One Racing (2009–Present)
Fashion TV (19??-Presente)
Sabrina De Fin De Semana (1990–Present)
Estaciones Sociales (2002–Present)
Con Jatnna (2000–Present)
Mi Pueblo Por Dentro (2008–Present)
Foro Legislativo
Diario Del Domingo (2006–Present)

References

External links
Color Visión home page

Television stations in the Dominican Republic
Spanish-language television stations
Television channels and stations established in 1969
1969 establishments in the Dominican Republic